Michał Jelonek (born 30 May 1971), also known as Jelonek, is a Polish musician and composer. He specializes in violin.

He is a member of bands Hunter and Orkiestra Dni Naszych, and former member of Ankh. In 2007 Jelonek released his first, self-titled solo album.

Early life 

He was born in Kielce, Poland. He learned to play the violin from Professor Andrzej Zuzański. He received his Diploma in 1989 when he performed Ludwig van Beethoven's Violin Concerto in D major, accompanied by the Kielce Philharmonic Orchestra. Michal toured with the Symphonic Orchestra and the Chamber Orchestra of the Kielce Philharmonic and later performed with the String Quintet Collegium Musicum from 1989 to 1994 and the Theatre Diaspora from 1992 to 1994.

Work 
He has performed with many Polish bands between 1992 and 2008 including Ankh, Closterkeller, De Press, Firebirds, Grejfrut, Hunter, Kasa, Lizar, Lzy, Mafia, Maybe-b, Orkiestra Dni Naszych, Perfect, Szwagierkolaska, Teatr Kobiet, Tosteer, T-Raperzy znad Wisły, and Wilki. He also performed with Maryla Rodowicz, Ilona Sojda, Wojciech Gąsowski, and Stan Borys.

Michal Jelonek has been featured on over 30 albums ranging from classical to pop, folk, rock and roll and heavy metal. He has performed over 1600 concerts in Poland, Brazil, Czech Republic, Estonia, Lithuania, Latvia, Mexico, Germany, Russia, Slovakia, Sweden, Switzerland, and Ukraine. He has also recorded music for movies and commercials. He released his first solo album in 2007 titled Jelonek.

He has received several nominations for best Polish instrumentalist, in 1993 by Tylko Rock magazine and in 1994 by Siedlce Rock 94 among others.

Band

Discography

Solo albums

Video albums

Music videos

Other appearances

References

External links 

 

1971 births
Living people
20th-century Polish musicians
21st-century Polish musicians
Mystic Production artists
Polish violinists
Polish double-bassists
Male double-bassists
Violists
Polish classical violinists
Male classical violinists
Polish rock musicians
Polish heavy metal musicians
Polish folk musicians
Polish keyboardists
Polish pop musicians
Progressive rock musicians
Progressive metal musicians
21st-century classical violinists
21st-century double-bassists
20th-century male musicians
21st-century male musicians
20th-century violists
21st-century violists